Mehmke is a village and a former municipality in the district Altmarkkreis Salzwedel, in Saxony-Anhalt, Germany. Since 1 September 2010, it is part of the municipality Diesdorf.

References

Former municipalities in Saxony-Anhalt
Altmarkkreis Salzwedel